Laval-d'Aurelle (Auvergnat: L'Aval d'Aurèla) is a former commune in the Ardèche department in southern France. On 1 January 2019, it was merged into the new commune Saint-Laurent-les-Bains-Laval-d'Aurelle.

Population

See also
Communes of the Ardèche department

References

Former communes of Ardèche
Ardèche communes articles needing translation from French Wikipedia
Populated places disestablished in 2019